Husbands Beware is a 1956 short subject directed by Jules White starring American slapstick comedy team The Three Stooges (Moe Howard, Larry Fine and Shemp Howard). It is the 167th entry in the series released by Columbia Pictures starring the comedians, who released 190 shorts for the studio between 1934 and 1959.

Plot
Moe and Larry marry Shemp's overweight sisters (Lou Leonard and Maxine Gates), and discover to their horror after the vows that the girls are a couple of battle axes.Ordered to prepare a wedding feast,Moe and Larry produce hard-as-a-rock muffins;coffee scented with soap;and roast turkey bathed in flammable turpentine. After being kicked out from their place, the new bridegrooms vow revenge on Shemp for introducing them. Later, Shemp has a voice lesson with student, Fanny Dinkelmeyer since he is a music teacher. He then discovers that he has to marry a woman within seven hours to receive $500,000 from his dead Uncle's will.

After some searching, the Stooges finally find Shemp's student, Ms. Dinkelmeyer. Several of Shemp's old ex-girlfriends all arrive at the Justice of the Peace's office, wreaking havoc in an attempt to marry Shemp for his money. But Shemp weds the harridan, just under the deadline, and then discovers that his Uncle is not dead, there is no $500,000 will, and that everything was Moe and Larry's revenge because Shemp let Moe and Larry marry his two overweight sisters and got divorced. Shemp gets so angry, he takes out a gun and shoots Moe and Larry in the rear end as they try to flee.

Cast

Credited
 Moe Howard as Moe
 Larry Fine as Larry
 Shemp Howard as Shemp (first short released after he died)
 Lou Leonard as Dora
 Maxine Gates as Flora
 Christine McIntyre as Lulu Hopkins (stock footage)
 Dee Green as Fanny Dinkelmeyer (stock footage)
 Sally Cleaves as Fanny Dinkelmeyer (new footage, uncredited)

Uncredited
 Emil Sitka as Justice of the Peace Benton
 Doris Houck as Aggressive former girlfriend (stock footage)
 Nancy Saunders, Judy Malcolm, Virginia Hunter, Nancy Saunders, Alyn Lockwood as Shemp's former Girlfriends (all stock footage)
 Johnny Kascier as Bellboy (stock footage)

Production notes
The second half of Husbands Beware is stock footage from 1947's Brideless Groom. In the new footage of the wedding sequence, a double stands in for Dee Green (Fanny Dinkelmeyer). New scenes were filmed on May 17, 1955.

Husbands Beware was the first posthumous Stooge release featuring Shemp Howard, who died on November 22, 1955.

See also
List of American films of 1956

References

External links
 
 
Husbands Beware at threestooges.net

1956 films
1956 comedy films
The Three Stooges films
American black-and-white films
The Three Stooges film remakes
Films directed by Jules White
Columbia Pictures short films
1950s English-language films
1950s American films
American comedy films